Apantesis cervinoides is a moth of the  family Erebidae. It was described by Strecker in 1876. It is found above treeline in the Rocky Mountains of Colorado. The habitat consists of alpine areas, including rocky slopes.

This species was formerly a member of the genus Grammia, but was moved to Apantesis along with the other species of the genera Holarctia, Grammia, and Notarctia.

References

 Natural History Museum Lepidoptera generic names catalog

Arctiina
Moths described in 1876
Taxa named by Herman Strecker